Nina Ridge is a British weather forecaster on the BBC.

Early life
Ridge was born Nina Humphries. Her great-grandmother was Sylvia Payne.

Ridge grew up in the west of Kent, and went to a girls' grammar school. She studied Mathematics with Management Studies at the University of Leeds. She did a PGCE at the University of Bristol, and is a qualified Maths teacher.

Career
Ridge initially taught Maths and PE at her old school, Weald of Kent Grammar, for three years, but continued teaching her year 11 class in 2018 after officially resigning in order to ensure their success in their GCSES. She now works part-time as a teacher at Skinners' School.

BBC
Ridge joined the BBC Weather Centre in December 2001, after seeing a job advert in The Guardian. Ridge has also appeared on Stargazing Live. She presented forecasts for national TV on BBC One until August 2015, and now one of main evening forecasters for BBC South East. She took to the skies with The Blades a Eastbourne Airbourne.

Personal life
In June 1999, Ridge married John Ridge, an officer in the Royal Engineers. 
Ridge has four children, two daughters (born June 2004 and June 2009) and two sons (born in April 2006 and December 2008).

Ridge is a veteran athlete who regularly runs competitively with Tonbridge Athletic Club. Her husband received a CBE for his work in the Hurricane Relief Operation.

References

External links
 BBC Profile

Year of birth missing (living people)
Living people
Alumni of the University of Bristol
Alumni of the University of Leeds
BBC weather forecasters